Yow or YOW may refer to:

 Kay Yow, an American basketball coach
 David Yow, American vocalist and musician
 Deborah Yow, Director of Athletics at North Carolina State University
 Jeme Tien Yow, a Chinese railroad engineer
 YOW, the IATA code for the Ottawa Macdonald–Cartier International Airport

See also 
 Yowie (disambiguation)